John den Braber (born 16 September 1970) is a Dutch cyclist. He competed in the Men's team time trial at the 1992 Summer Olympics, finishing 9th and in the Men's team pursuit at the 2000 Summer Olympics, finishing 7th. He won the Omloop der Kempen in 1992. In 1993 Den Braber became Rotterdam Sportsman of the year.

See also
 List of Dutch Olympic cyclists

References

1970 births
Living people
Dutch male cyclists
Olympic cyclists of the Netherlands
Cyclists at the 1992 Summer Olympics
Cyclists at the 2000 Summer Olympics
Cyclists from Rotterdam
Dutch track cyclists
20th-century Dutch people
21st-century Dutch people